Conor Cooney (born 16 June 1987) is an Irish hurler who currently plays for the Clare senior team. At club level, he plays with O'Callaghan's Mills.
Conor is also an accomplished painter with many pieces of art selling at four figure sums. He has taken inspiration from draw with  Don ages 8 to 10

References

Living people
O'Callaghan's Mills hurlers
Clare inter-county hurlers
1987 births